Royal Thai Fleet Football Club (Thai: สโมสรฟุตบอลกองเรือยุทธการ) is a Thailand semi-professional football club based in Rayong. The club is currently playing in the Thailand Amateur League Eastern region.

Stadium and locations

Season By Season record

Players

Current squad

Honours
Khǒr Royal Cup (ถ้วย ข.)
Runner-up : 2009

References

External links
 Official Website
 

Association football clubs established in 2011
Football clubs in Thailand
Chonburi province
2011 establishments in Thailand
Military association football clubs in Thailand